The Chevron B3 (also known as the Chevron GT) was the first sports racing car that was developed and built by British manufacturer Chevron, in 1966. It was designed by British engineer, Derek Bennett. It was powered by a naturally-aspirated  Ford twin-cam four-cylinder engine. Over its racing career, spanning two years, it won a respectable 8 races (plus 1 additional class win), and took 10 podium finishes.

References

Chevron racing cars
Sports prototypes
24 Hours of Le Mans race cars
Group 4 (racing) cars
Sports racing cars